Glenelg High School is a public high school in Glenelg, Maryland, United States. Glenelg HS is located in the western portion of Howard County, Maryland and is part of the Howard County public schools system, which is among the highest-ranked in the nation.

The school is located just west of Maryland Route 32, south of Interstate 70, and east of Maryland Route 97.

History
As the second continuously-operated high school in Howard County (after Howard High School), Glenelg opened its doors in 1958. The school is named for Glenelg, a postal village named after Glenelg Manor, which in turn was named after the town of Glenelg, Scotland.

The 22.79 acres of land for Glenelg was purchased from the Musgroves for in 1955 $9,117.40. Glenelg opened as Howard County public schools were converting in a phased-in approach from segregated schools to integrated, one grade per year.
A 1965 cross burning onsite was an indication of the strained race relations of the era.

The building itself has gone through many changes over the years to cope with the growing population of the west side of Howard County, including a new drama/music wing, and most recently with the construction on a new science wing and an addition to the cafeteria.

Students
Glenelg student body enrollment through the years has fluctuated due to many factors, including new housing construction and redistricting. The demographics show mostly white youth.

Academics
In 2021, Glenelg was ranked as the 400th best high school in the nation, 9th best in Maryland, and 2nd best in Howard County, by U.S. News & World Report.

Athletics
Glenelg has won the following state championships:

Baseball
First Howard County team to ever win State in baseball
1983, 1993, 1995, 1998, 1999, 2021

Basketball
Girls: 1999, 2001, 2016

Field Hockey
 2010, 2011, 2012, 2017, 2021, 2022 2021

Cross Country
Boys: 1983, 1991, 2001, 2002, 2007
Girls: 1990, 2003

Golf
Added as a sport in 2005
2006

Ice Hockey
2010

Indoor Track
Boys: 1990, 1991, 1992, 2005
Girls: 1993, 1999

Lacrosse
Boys: 2007, 2008, 2011, 2019
Girls: 2005, 2008, 2016, 2017, 2018

Soccer
Boys: 1992, 1997, 2022
Girls: 1997, 1999, 2000, 2006, 2007, 2008, 2021

Track and Field
Girls: 1993, 2002

Volleyball
1993, 1995, 2002, 2005, 2021

Wrestling
2008

Extracurricular activities
Glenelg's FIRST Robotics Competition Team 888 came in first in 2002 at the Western Michigan Regional and in 2007 at the Battle of Baltimore.

Notable alumni
 Caroline Bowman, Singer and actress
 David H. Berger, 38th Commandant US Marine Corps
 Brian Johnston, New York Giants Super Bowl champion
 Omar J. "Jamie" Jones IV, US Army general
 Warren E. Miller, Maryland State Delegate
 Margo Seibert, actress
 Greg Smith, retired major league baseball player
 Megan Taylor, former Maryland women's lacrosse player, Tewaaraton Award winner (2019)

Image gallery

Controversy 
On May 24, 2018, Glenelg High School property was defaced with racially-charged hate speech. The perpetrators spray-painted school property with swastikas and other racially-charged epithets.

References and notes

 Newsweek

External links

 Glenelg High School
 http://www.glenelgbands.com
 Aerial view via Google Maps

Public high schools in Maryland
Public schools in Howard County, Maryland
Educational institutions established in 1958
1958 establishments in Maryland